A layback spin is a variation of the upright spin, a spin in figure skating. British figure skater Cecilia Colledge was "responsible for the invention" of the spin and the first to execute it. Colledge's coach, Jacques Gerschwiler, who was a former gymnastics teacher and according to Colledge "very progressive in his ideas", got the idea for the upright spin while watching one of Colledge's trainers, a former circus performer turned acrobatics instructor, train Colledge to perform backbends "by means of a rope tied around her waist". The upright spin has long been associated with women's skating, but men have also performed it. Skaters include it in their programs because it increases their technical content and fulfills choreographic needs.

The layback spin is executed by holding the free leg in a back attitude position and arching the head and upper body backward so that the skater faces up towards the sky, ceiling, or further. The free leg position is optional. A variation of the layback spin is the Biellmann spin, made popular by world champion Denise Biellmann, which the International Skating Union (ISU), the organization that governs figure skating, considers a difficult variation of the layback spin. It is executed by the skater grabbing their free blade and pulling the heel of their boot behind and above the level of the head so that their legs are in an approximate full split, with the head and back arched upward. The spin "requires much strength and extreme flexibility".

Other difficult variations of the layback spin are the full layback (the upper body is arched sideways with the upper body bent to the side from the waist towards the ice or arched back from the waist towards the ice) and when the skater's upper body is arched sideways or arched back, with their free leg almost touching their head in a full circle. In ice dance, difficult variations of the layback spin include a split, with both legs straight and the boot of one partner's free leg held up higher than their head (which can be supported by their partner) and leaning away from the other partner, with the axis to their upper back to the knee over 45 degrees.

Gallery

References

Works cited 
 Hines, James R. (2006) Figure Skating: A History. Urbana, Illinois: University of Illinois Press. .
 Kestnbaum, Ellyn (2003). Culture on Ice: Figure Skating and Cultural Meaning. Middletown, Connecticut: Wesleyan University Press. .

Figure skating elements